Kan'ichi Nagazawa was a Japanese Major General who participated in World War II. During the war, he was known for being the main commander of the 121st Infantry Regiment and as the main commander and survivor of the Battle of Ramree Island.

Biography
Nagazawa was born at the Kyoto Prefecture on October 2, 1891. On May 1913, he graduated from the Imperial Japanese Army Academy, ranking 25th at his class. On December of the same year, he was appointed as a Ensign.

In August 1931, he was promoted to Major. In August 1935, he was appointed as a member of the  headquarters and on August 1936, he was promoted to Lieutenant Colonel. On August 1940, he was promoted to Colonel and was appointed Commander of the 121st Infantry Regiment at the outbreak of the Pacific War. He then proceeded to participate at the Burma campaign as well as participate at the Battle of Ramree Island. In February 1945, he was given command of the 55th Infantry Regiment and was promoted to Major General in June of the same year. He was then transferred to the Southern Expeditionary Army Group and surrendered at Phnom Penh.

He died on August 26, 1981 at his home in Tottori due to a cerebral infarction.

References

Bibliography

 

1891 births
1981 deaths
Imperial Japanese Army Academy alumni
Imperial Japanese Army generals of World War II
Military personnel from Kyoto Prefecture